Pha Khao is a district (amphoe) of Loei Province, northeastern Thailand.

Geography
Neighboring districts are (from the south clockwise): Phu Kradueng, Nong Hin, Wang Saphung, and Erawan of Loei Province; and Si Bun Rueang of Nong Bua Lamphu Province.

History
The minor district (king amphoe) was established on 1 January 1988, when the four tambons, Pha Khao, Tha Chang Khlong, Non Po Daeng, and Non Pa Sang, were split off from Phu Kradueng. It was upgraded to a full district on 3 November 1993.

Administration
The district is divided into five sub-districts (tambons), which are further subdivided into 64 villages (mubans). There are no municipal (thesaban) areas. There are five tambon administrative organizations (TAO).

References

External links
amphoe.com

Pha Khao